Bellthorpe National Park is a national park located in Bellthorpe, Booroobin and Sandy Creek in both the Moreton Bay Region and Somerset Region of South East Queensland, Australia.  The park preserves eucalypt forest and rainforest of the southern Conondale Range.  Parts of the national park were previously known as Bellthor.

The rugged landscape at Bellthorpe falls within the catchment of Stony Creek, a tributary of the Stanley River.  Along the waterway are several small waterfalls, cascades and a rock pool.  The park also protects lands within the Brisbane River valley and Mary River catchments.

Remnants of a once prosperous timber cutting industry remain today.  Horse riding, mountain biking and bushwalking attract visitors.

Facilities
Although camping is not permitted a day-use area with wheelchair access is provided.  Stony Creek picnic area has toilets, picnic tables and wood barbecues.  There are no marked walking trails.

See also

 Protected areas of Queensland

References

External links
 

National parks of South East Queensland
Somerset Region
Moreton Bay Region